Chebeague Island is located in Casco Bay, an inlet of the Gulf of Maine. It was originally used as a fishing ground by Abenaki Native Americans. Also known as Great Chebeague (pronounced "sha-big") Island, today it is a town in Cumberland County, Maine, United States. Chebeague Island is the largest island in Casco Bay that is not connected to the mainland by a bridge. The largest island is Sebascodegan, or "Great Island," which is part of the Town of Harpswell and connected to the mainland by a bridge.

Chebeague Island is one of the twelve major islands of the Calendar Islands, a term that originated in 1700 with the report by the English military engineer Wolfgang William Römer, who claimed there were "as many islands as there are days in the year." As a corrective, the Maine State Historian Robert M. York stated there are "little more than two hundred islands" in Casco Bay.

Chebeague Island was a part of the Town of Cumberland until July 1, 2007, when it seceded and became the Town of Chebeague Island. The Town of Chebeague Island includes seventeen islands and their adjacent waters. These include the islands of Bangs, Bates, Hope, Ministerial, Sand, Stave, Stockman, and the tiny Upper Green Islands.

At the 2020 census, the town's year-round population of 396. The population is said to more than triple in the summer months.

Chebeague Island is part of the Portland–South Portland–Biddeford, Maine Metropolitan Statistical Area.

History 

According to island lore, the name "Chebeague" evolved from Chebiscodego, the name used by members of the Wabanaki Confederacy, a First Nations and Native American confederation of five principal nations: the Mi'kmaq, Maliseet, Passamaquoddy, Abenaki, and Penobscot. The most accepted definition of the word Chebeague is "Island of Many Springs." Other sources state that Chebeague comes from the Abenaki words T’Cabie or Chebidisco, meaning cold spring, or Jabeque or Gaboag, meaning separated, which recognizes the connectedness of Great Chebeague Island and Little Chebeague Island. Great Chebeague Island was also known for a time as Recompense Island.

The early Native American presence on the island was not year-round. During the summer months, Native Americans arrived by canoe to fish and gather shellfish for the winter months.

Early settlers included Zachariah Chandler, who bought 650 acres in 1746. Other early settlers were Ambrose Hamilton and Deborah Soule Hamilton, who had fourteen children and seventy-two grandchildren, the majority of whom settled on Chebeague. The early white settlers cleared much of the island's land for farming. Lobsters were so plentiful that they were used as fertilizer for the fields.

Early commerce on the island developed around fishing, farming, and the construction of "stone sloops," ships that carried quarried granite down the eastern seaboard for the building of breakwaters, lighthouses, and set navigational markers.

By the late 19th century and throughout the early 20th century, tourists from Canada, Boston, and points south began to visit Maine in a phenomenon sometimes known as the "rusticators" movement, where residents of New England's industrial cities sought to get back to nature for a few days or weeks. The tourists filled the cottages, rooming houses, and inns, such as the Chebeague Island Inn, that dotted the islands of Casco Bay. In 1900, Chebeague Island had five hotels. Tourists arrived on steamboats from Portland.

The Chebeague High School closed in 1956; the schoolhouse, built in 1871, still stands and serves as a museum for Great Chebeague's history. The strong sense of community is highlighted in its summer months, where children often participate in the many camps offered on the island. Popular are the farm camp, clown camp, British Soccer Camp, theatre camp, and many others sponsored by the island's recreation center. Among the most popular is the Chebeague Island Sailing School, created by the island's yacht club. In the acclaimed camp, students learn about small boat sailing while enjoying the great waters that Casco Bay offers.

Nearby Cousins Island is connected to the mainland by a bridge, and Great Chebeague has historically debated and entertained the idea of linking-up to the mainland or Cousins Island with a bridge of its own. The idea of building a bridge was last considered seriously in 1970, but was soundly voted down by islanders.

In 1997, the people of Chebeague were a significant part of a movement that managed to overturn Nabisco's first attempt at discontinuing the "Crown Pilot Crackers" from its product line. Due to its being such a tradition with the islanders as an accessory to their consumption of soup, an organized effort was created to bring the chowder cracker back. It was successful, so much so that not only was the Pilot Cracker made again, but it was turned into a media event, with Nabisco donating $1,000 to the Chebeague Historical Society. The cracker was ultimately cancelled however—this time for good—in 2008.

In 2002 Chebeague Island explored secession from Cumberland, with whom they had been tied for 184 years. The initiative gained traction after school district 51 considered downsizing the island elementary school. The island won independence from Cumberland after votes in the Maine Senate (31–3) and House of Representatives (131–1) on April 5, 2006.   The separation took effect on July 1, 2007.

Geography

The northern tip of the island is called Chebeague Point and the southern tip is called Deer Point.

Little Chebeague
Chebeague Island is known as "Great Chebeague," as it is not always a single landmass. The nearby island of "Little Chebeague" is accessible on foot, via a sandbar that appears at low tide. Being that there are many fresh-water underground springs and rivulets, low-tide exposed sandy areas such as the sandbar, or coves, often have "quicksand" zones that must be noted with caution. Little Chebeague, approximately 3/4 of a mile long, is uninhabited and mostly dense shrub and forest. It was used during World War II as the Fire Fighters School of the Portland Naval Training Center.  It is now owned by the Maine Bureau of Parks and Lands as an undeveloped park where picnicking, camping and swimming are allowed, but no facilities are provided. Nearby Great Diamond Island and Little Diamond Island also share this low-tide event of having a "great" and a "small" island classification.

Demographics

2010 census
As of the census of 2010, there were 341 people, 171 households, and 98 families residing in the town. The racial makeup of the town was 99.1% White, 0.3% African American, 0.3% Asian, and 0.3% from two or more races.

There were 171 households, of which 18.1% had children under the age of 18 living with them, 49.1% were married couples living together, 5.3% had a female householder with no husband present, 2.9% had a male householder with no wife present, and 42.7% were non-families. 37.4% of all households were made up of individuals, and 19.9% had someone living alone who was 65 years of age or older. The average household size was 1.99 and the average family size was 2.63.

The median age in the town was 57.9 years. 15% of residents were under the age of 18; 4% were between the ages of 18 and 24; 14.1% were from 25 to 44; 32% were from 45 to 64; and 34.9% were 65 years of age or older. The gender makeup of the town was 48.4% male and 51.6% female.

Transportation

Transportation to the island includes two ferry services. The Chebeague Transportation Company (CTC) makes the 15-minute run from Wharf Road on Cousins Island to the Stone Wharf on the north-west side of the island. Casco Bay Lines provides service on all mail boat and other "down-bay" trips that travel beyond Long Island, Maine.

One main macadam-paved road (with various different names, including North Road and South Road) loops around the island, with a few connecting paved or partly-paved roads in between, such as Schoolhouse Road, Roy Hill Road, and Littlefield Avenue.[4]  Coming off the paved road, there are many unpaved roads going to residential homes and various points and beaches. The beaches are considered state land and anyone can walk on them, like state park property, thus the reason many of the smaller roads simply end at coastal points. Some of smaller "roads" are merely single-lane, rutted sand trails with heavy overgrowth to either side, and on the off-chance two cars meet coming at one another, one car must pull to the side or back up to a suitable area to allow the other to pass. Most residents have "island cars" that they use year-round; they take the abuse of rutted back roads with overgrowth that scratches the sides of vehicles, as well as the corrosive, briny Casco Bay air. Island cars are not required to have license plates, although they must be registered.

Children of year-round residents take a boat back and forth to the mainland every day from the Stone Pier to go to middle and high school. Elementary-school-age children usually stay on the island to attend the school house, which houses grades K–5.

Wildlife and nature 
Deer, red fox, a variety of non-venomous snakes, raccoons, grey squirrels, frogs and toads, gray and black back gulls, loons, and ducks are all creatures that can be seen on and about the island. Curiously, no skunks are to be found on this, the second largest island in Casco Bay Mosquitoes can be a nuisance, and much of the island is soft, sandy, swampy soil (due largely in part to the many underground springs), which are perfect conditions for mosquito breeding.

Harbor seals can often be spotted from the shores of Chebeague, swimming or sunning themselves on the rocks of nearby uninhabited islands or on depth-marker buoys. Occasionally one might spot a porpoise breaking surface as well. Lobsters and lobstering are a big part of Casco Bay, and the ocean surrounding Chebeague is dotted by thousands of lobster pot buoys, the livelihood of many year-round residents in the area. Lobstering is a big commodity of Casco Bay. Locals often fish from the docks and piers for mackerel, bluefish, or striped bass, just a few of many abundant fish in the area, and crab traps hang from the docks.

Blueberries 
All over the island, as Maine is often known for, are blueberry patches that supply an abundant amount of blueberries, ardently picked by the locals. However, they are slowly decreasing in size as land development continues.

Clamming and red tide 

The many inlet coves around the island are home to abundant clam beds. During low tide, these fully exposed areas can be walked on and are often clammed by the locals, some of whom have made a living for decades harvesting steamers, hen clams, and razor clams from the muddy, clay-rich soil. Clamming is often shut down when the red tide—a harmful microscopic ocean organism that affects shellfish—"blooms" in the area. People who eat clams that are affected by the red tide (even steamed ones) can become violently ill; the algae can be fatal. This paralytic poisoning often causes death to humans, birds, larval and adult fish, and marine mammals.

For many years, mussels—which grow in clusters, attached by "beards" to rocks and seaweed, pier pilings, buoys, and just about any stable structure in the ocean—were largely ignored as inedible. But during the 1980s and early 1990s, when clams were getting more difficult to acquire, mussels began to be considered good eating. Some consider these mollusks a bit more "gamey" in taste compared to clams but quite similar otherwise. Mussels can be reaped in much larger quantities, very quickly.

Clams have to be dug out of the sand, by hand, with an angled pick; they very often withdraw deeper into their sand tunnel when they "hear" someone digging for them. This makes harvesting clams a backbreaking task. The clam shell may be broken during this procedure, ruining it. Mussels, on the other hand, are lying attached to rocks on the shore during low tide, and a bucketful can be collected in minutes. Marketing demands have reduced the mussel population greatly, and now they are often "grown" by farmers on floating barges where they can be easily "picked" when ready.

Ocean geography, tides, and weather 
Typically Great Chebeague has  tides under normal conditions. Ocean floor geography in the general area can vary drastically, thus careful navigation must be practiced when boating, even in small vessels. Many islands, including Great Chebeague, have extended rock outcroppings that are completely underwater during high tide, but may be lurking just below the surface as the tide drops, and may appear  out of the water during low tide. The rip tide can be several knots, and rowing against it is physically impossible: Extra care must be taken when venturing out in small watercraft. Even on the clearest day, a thick fog can suddenly "roll in" out of nowhere, reducing visibility to zero.

Even during the warmest summer months, the ocean temperature is barely above . Falling out of a boat into the water anytime between September and April can be dangerous, if not fatal, depending on the time of year. Swimming is enjoyed usually in inlets and coves where the water temperature is slightly higher, and off the pier or docks. Like most islands in the area, Chebeague has as much rocky cliffs for a shoreline as beaches. The "Niblic" beach by the boatyard and Deer Point by Chandler's Cove are popular beaches for their soft stretch of sand. On a clear day at Deer Point, one can see Mount Washington in New Hampshire. When the sun goes down, temperatures can drop drastically and, even on the warmest summer days, nights are often very cool and can require long sleeves and pants and even a fire in the fireplace. Winters can be brutal, and usually by September, most of the non-year-round residents are packed up and gone.

Services and stores 

Chebeague Island has its own post office. There is cell phone service on the island.

The Town of Chebeague Island has a webpage that provides access to town documents, a town calendar, and other information. The Town Administrator is Marjorie E. Stratton.

There is one school on the island which has classes Pre-K through 5th grade. Students in sixth grade and older attend schools on the mainland. Sixth through eighth graders attend Frank H. Harrison Middle School in Yarmouth and ninth graders to seniors attend Yarmouth High School.

The Chebeague Island Boatyard provides a variety of services ranging from indoor heated storage and nightly mooring rentals to portable marine engine diagnostics and fabricating or refinishing woodwork. In the summer months, a gift store, the Niblic, is open at the Boatyard.

The Chebeague Island Methodist Church is the island's oldest institution and the island's only church. Its roots extend back into the 18th century when Methodist missionaries visited Casco Bay. The island matriarch was "excommunicated" from the Congregational Church when she joined the Methodists. They held class meetings and built a small meetinghouse. In 1814 nearly all of the 19 members were connected to the Hamiltons. As Chebeague's population grew the need for a new church became apparent. In 1855 a schism about the location occurred. As a result, two Methodist churches were built within sight of each other. When the Methodist Protestant Church closed around 1890, they were welcomed back to the Methodist Episcopal. A new parsonage was built in 1885–1886 and has housed many pastors and their families. Today, the church is led by Melissa Yosua-Davis.

The local historical museum run by the Chebeague Island Historical Society is open during the summer months. The Chebeague Island Library is open year-round.

Second Wind Farm, run by Charles Varney, provides islanders with locally-grown produce during the season.

The Chebeague Island Inn and restaurant is open in the summer, as is a nine-hole golf course, a tennis club, and two gifts shops, the Niblic, located at the Boatyard, and Island Riches, located near the landing for the Casco Bay Ferry.

There is a full-time volunteer fire station and EMTs/ambulance.

Police matters are handled by Cumberland County Sheriff officers. If there is a medical emergency, one must be taken to the mainland via the ambulance and ferry, which are always on call.

Notable people 

 David Dodd, educator, financial analyst, author, economist
 Raymond Gilmartin, former CEO of Merck & Co.
 Ellen Goodman, Pulitzer Prize winning syndicated newspaper columnist

See also
 List of islands of Maine

References

External links

 Town of Chebeague Island official website
 Chebeague Island Historical Society
 Chebeague Island Library 
 Chebeague Island News

Islands of Cumberland County, Maine
Towns in Cumberland County, Maine
Populated places established in 2007
Portland metropolitan area, Maine
Islands of Casco Bay
Islands of Maine